Sasha Moisa (Ukrainian: Саша Мойса; born September 10, 1994) is a Ukrainian Muay Thai and Lethwei fighter currently signed to ONE Championship and World Lethwei Championship. He is the current WMC Super welterweight World Champion in Muaythai and WLC Light Middleweight World Champion in Lethwei.

Early life
Sasha Moisa was born in Odessa, Ukraine. He trained in judo at the age of 13 but turned to Muay Thai at 18.

Muay Thai and kickboxing career
In 2016, he moved to Bangkok to focus on training fulltime in Muay Thai. He currently trains out of the Behzad Warrior Academy in Bangkok, Thailand.

Sasha Moisa first appeared on Thai Fight at THAI FIGHT Khmer 2017, facing the veteran Sudsakorn Sor Klinmee on November 25, 2017. He lost by decision.

On July 7, 2018, Moisa faced Satanfah Rachanon at THAI FIGHT Hat Yai, where he lost a questionable extra-round decision.

On October 19, 2018, Sasha Moisa captured his first major Muay Thai world title when he defeated Bangpleenoi Petchyindee Academy by second-round knockout to claim the World Muaythai Council Super Welterweight Championship.

On November 24, 2018, Moisa defeated Cambodia's Keo Rumchong at THAI FIGHT Saraburi by second-round TKO in the 2018 THAI FIGHT Kard Chuek 70 kg Semi-Finals. He was originally scheduled to face Saensatharn P.K. Saenchai Muaythaigym for the 2018 THAI FIGHT Kard Chuek 70 kg Championship and ultimately won the title by forfeit when Saensatharn was forced to withdraw due to injury. He finally faced Saensatharn at THAI FIGHT Mueang Khon 2019 on March 30, 2019. Moisa won in upset fashion when he stopped Saensatharn with a one-punch knockout.

ONE Championship
Sasha Moisa made his debut for ONE Championship when he entered the ONE Featherweight Kickboxing World Grand Prix, facing Jo Nattawut at ONE Championship: Enter the Dragon on May 17, 2019. Moisa went on to lose via third-round TKO.

Moisa was originally scheduled to face Yodsanklai Fairtex at ONE Championship: Age Of Dragons but was forced to withdraw from the bout. He ultimately returned at ONE Warrior Series 10 on February 19, 2020, where he knocked out Shahzaib Rindh in the third round.

Lethwei career

World Lethwei Championship
Sasha Moisa made his Lethwei debut on February 22, 2019, at WLC 7: Mighty Warriors, where he knocked out Myanmar fighter Shwe Yar Mann in the third round.

In 2019, he challenged Artur Saladiak for the WLC Light Middleweight World Championship. On August 2, 2019, at WLC 9: King of Nine Limbs, Moisa emerged victorious by unanimous decision and was crowned WLC Light Middleweight World Champion.

Championships and accomplishments

Muay Thai
 THAI FIGHT
 2018 Thai Fight 70kg Kard Chuek Champion
 World Muaythai Council 
 2018 WMC World Super Welterweight 154 lbs Champion
 Real Hero Muay Thai 
 2018 Real Hero Muay Thai 70 kg 8-Man Tournament Champion
 Elite Fight Night by Elite Boxing 
 2016 EFN King's Cup Middleweight 4-Man Tournament Champion

Lethwei
 World Lethwei Championship
 WLC Light Middleweight World Champion

Lethwei record

|- style="background:#cfc;"
| 2019-08-02 || Win || align="left" | Artur Saladiak ||  WLC 9: King of Nine Limbs ||Mandalay, Myanmar || Decision (Unanimous) || 5 || 3:00
|-
! style=background:white colspan=9 |
|- style="background:#cfc;"
| 2019-02-19 || Win || align="left" | Shwe Yar Man || WLC 7: Mighty Warriors || Mandalay, Myanmar || KO || 3 || 1:40
|-
| colspan=9 | Legend:

Muay Thai & kickboxing record

|-  style="background:#CCFFCC;"
| 2020-02-19|| Win ||align=left| Shazaib Rindh ||  |ONE Warrior Series 10 || Kallang, Singapore || KO (Punches) || 3 || 2:11
|- style="background:#FFBBBB;"
| 2019-05-17|| Loss|| align="left" | Jo Nattawut || ONE Championship: Enter the Dragon || Kallang, Singapore|| TKO (3 Knockdown Rule) || 3 || 1:24
|-
! style=background:white colspan=9 |
|-  style="background:#CCFFCC;"
| 2019-03-30|| Win ||align=left| Saensatharn P.K. Saenchai Muaythaigym || THAI FIGHT Mueang Khon 2019 || Nakhon Si Thammarat, Thailand || KO (Punch) || 1 ||
|-  style="background:#CCFFCC;"
| 2018-11-24|| Win ||align=left| Keo Rumchong || THAI FIGHT Saraburi || Saraburi, Thailand || TKO (3 Knockdown Rule) || 2 ||
|-  style="background:#CCFFCC;"
| 2018-10-19|| Win ||align=left| Bangpleenoi Petchyindee Academy || True4U Toyota Marathon || Bangkok, Thailand || KO (Elbow & Punches) || 2 ||  
|-
! style=background:white colspan=9 |
|-  style="background:#FFBBBB
| 2018-07-07|| Loss ||align=left|  Satanfah Rachanon || THAI FIGHT Hat Yai || Hat Yai, Thailand || Ext R. Decision || 4 || 3:00
|-  style="background:#CCFFCC
| 2018-03-11|| Win ||align=left|  Muhammad Khalil || Real Hero Muay Thai || Bangkok, Thailand || KO (Punches) || 1 || 1:31   
|-
! style=background:white colspan=9 |
|-  style="background:#CCFFCC
| 2018-03-11|| Win ||align=left|  Chanasuek Lookchaomaesaitong || Real Hero Muay Thai || Bangkok, Thailand || KO (Punches) || 1 || 2:36
|-  style="background:#CCFFCC
| 2018-03-11|| Win ||align=left|  Boyka Bronson || Real Hero Muay Thai || Bangkok, Thailand || KO (Punch) || 1 || 0:20
|-  style="background:#FFBBBB;"
| 2017-11-25|| Loss ||align=left| Sudsakorn Sor Klinmee || THAI FIGHT Khmer 2017 || Phnom Penh, Cambodia || Decision || 3 || 3:00
|-  style="background:#FFBBBB;"
| 2017-09-30|| Loss ||align=left| Buakiew Por.Pongsawang || All Star Fight 2 || Bangkok, Thailand || Decision || 3 || 3:00
|-  style="background:#CCFFCC;"
| 2017-07-29 || Win ||align=left| Kurtis Allen || Elite Fight Night 10 || Kuala Lumpur, Malaysia || TKO (Referee stoppage) || 3 || 2:14     
|-
! style=background:white colspan=9 |
|-  style="background:#CCFFCC;"
| 2017-07-29 || Win ||align=left| Thirapong Kiatkorwit || Elite Fight Night 10 || Kuala Lumpur, Malaysia || KO (Punches) || 2 || 1:47
|-  style="background:#CCFFCC;"
| 2017-05-31 || Win ||align=left| Singsarawat Sitpinyo || E-1 World Championship || Hong Kong || KO || 2 ||
|-  style="background:#CCFFCC
| 2017-03-11|| Win ||align=left| T-98|| REBELS.49 || Tokyo, Japan || TKO || 3 || 2:15
|-  style="background:#FFBBBB;"
| 2016-12-24 || Win ||align=left| Changpuek Muaythai Academy || Workpoint Super Muaythai || Bangkok, Thailand || Decision || 3 || 3:00
|-  style="background:#CCFFCC;"
| 2016-11-26 || Win ||align=left| Singyai Sitchansingh || Workpoint Super Muaythai || Bangkok, Thailand || KO (Elbow) || 1 || 2:09
|-  style="background:#CCFFCC;"
| 2016-09-25 || Win ||align=left| Cédric Desruisseaux || Workpoint Super Muaythai || Bangkok, Thailand || Decision || 3 || 3:00
|-  style="background:#CCFFCC;"
| 2016-08-12 || Win ||align=left| Petchmankong Nondaeng Gym || Elite Fight Night 6 || Bangkok, Thailand || Decision || 3 || 3:00
|-  style="background:#CCFFCC;"
| 2016-08-12 || Win ||align=left| Mansurbek Tolipov || Elite Fight Night 6 || Bangkok, Thailand || Decision || 3 || 3:00
|-  style="background:#FFBBBB;"
| 2015-12-05|| Loss ||align=left| Armin Pumpanmuang || Workpoint Super Muaythai || Bangkok, Thailand || Decision || 3 || 3:00
|-  style="background:#FFBBBB;"
| 2014-12-07|| Loss ||align=left| Nontachai Sititsukato || MAX Muay Thai || Pattaya, Thailand || Decision || 3 || 3:00 
|-
| colspan=9 | Legend:

See also
List of male kickboxers

References

External links
 Sasha Moisa at ONE Championship

Ukrainian male kickboxers
Ukrainian Muay Thai practitioners
Ukrainian Lethwei practitioners
Middleweight kickboxers
1994 births
Living people
ONE Championship kickboxers
Sportspeople from Odesa